A Dance of the Forests is one of the most recognized of Wole Soyinka's plays. It was "presented at the Nigerian Independence celebrations in 1960, it ... denigrated the glorious African past and warned Nigerians and all Africans that their energies henceforth should be spent trying to avoid repeating the mistakes that have already been made." At the time of its release, it was an iconoclastic work that angered many of the elite in Soyinka's native Nigeria. Politicians were particularly incensed at Soyinka's prescient portrayal of post-colonial Nigerian politics as aimless and corrupt. Despite the deluge of criticism, the play remains an influential work. In it, Soyinka espouses a unique vision for a new Africa, one that is able to forge a new identity free from the influence of European imperialism. 

A Dance of the Forests is regarded as Soyinka's theatrical debut and has been considered the most complex and difficult to understand of his plays. In it, Soyinka unveils the rotten aspects of society and demonstrates that the past is no better than the present when it comes to the seamy side of life. He lays bare the fabric of Nigerian society and warns people that they are on the brink of a new stage in their history: independence.  

The play was published in London and New York in 1963 by Oxford University Press (Three Crowns Books).

References

1960 plays
Plays by Wole Soyinka
Plays set in Nigeria
Nigerian plays